Kolegjet profesionale, private "Medicom", is a defunct Higher Education institution (HEI) in Tirana, Albania. On 6 August 2014 its licence was permanently revoked by the Albanian Ministry of Education and Sports (MAS), through decision no. 539 of the Albanian Council of Ministers, for not fulfilling the minimum legal requirements of higher education.

References

Educational institutions disestablished in 2014